Marcelo Alejandro Galeazzi (29 November 1966 – 1 June 2016) was an Argentine former professional footballer who played as a defender for clubs of Argentina, Chile and Israel.

Clubs
 Ferro Carril Oeste 1986–1987
 Atlanta 1987–1988
 Ferro Carril Oeste 1988
 Deportivo Español 1988–1989
 San Miguel 1990–1991
 Los Andes 1991–1992
 Racing Club 1992–1993
 Cobreloa 1993
 San Lorenzo 1993–1994
 Sportivo Italiano 1994–1995
 Tigre 1995–1996
 San Miguel 1996–1997
 Maccabi Kiryat Gat 1997

Death
Galeazzi died of cardiac arrest on 1 June 2016.

References

External links
 

1966 births
2016 deaths
Argentine footballers
Association football defenders
Racing Club de Avellaneda footballers
Club Atlético Los Andes footballers
Club Atlético Atlanta footballers
Ferro Carril Oeste footballers
Sportivo Italiano footballers
San Lorenzo de Almagro footballers
Club Atlético Tigre footballers
Cobreloa footballers
Maccabi Kiryat Gat F.C. players
Chilean Primera División players
Argentine Primera División players
Argentine expatriate footballers
Argentine expatriate sportspeople in Chile
Expatriate footballers in Chile
Argentine expatriate sportspeople in Israel
Expatriate footballers in Israel
Footballers from Rosario, Santa Fe